Koluch (also Romanized as Kolūch; also known as Kolūj) is a village in Darram Rural District, in the Central District of Tarom County, Zanjan Province, Iran. At the 2006 census, its population was 435, in 103 families.

References 

Populated places in Tarom County